Lead Me Astray is a 2015 Australian crime thriller film written and directed by Tom Danger and starring Jace Pickard, Alannah Robertson & Tim Page. This was filmed in Gosford, New South Wales.

Plot synopsis
A young student has a violent past he must confront when that very evil past puts his romantic interest in danger.

Cast
Jace Pickard as Alexis Willard
Addi Craig as Young Alexis
Alannah Robertson as Lacey Sinclair
Tim Page as Dr. Gene Seward
Logan Webster as Alpha
Paige Hepher as Skull
Kyren Bateman as Zombie
Dave Morgan as Barnyard
Tom Danger as X
Adib Attie as Y
Alex Fechine as Z

References

External links
Lead Me Astray on Internet Movie Database

2015 films
2015 horror thriller films
Australian horror thriller films
2010s English-language films
2010s Australian films